Porsön is a peninsula and residential area in Luleå, Sweden. It had 5,476 inhabitants in 2010 and is home to a large number of students. Luleå University of Technology and the business park Aurorum is located in the area.

References

External links
Porsön at Luleå Municipality

Luleå